Mrouzia, is one of the most important dishes of Moroccan cuisine. The plate is also known as M'assal in Rabat. It is a sweet and salty meat tajine, combining a ras el hanout blend of spices with honey, cinnamon and almonds.

This tajine is one of the traditional dishes of the Eid al-Adha Muslim festival (Festival of Sacrifice). It is often made of lamb from animals ritually sacrificed during the festival.

See also
List of Moroccan dishes

References

Moroccan cuisine